Greenway Halt railway station is a small railway station on the Dartmouth Steam Railway, a heritage railway in Devon, England. There has been no scheduled service at the station since 2020.

History
The original intention was that the line would continue towards the location of the Higher Ferry and a bridge built across the River Dart to Dartmouth but no agreement with land owners could be ascertained.

In 1972, British Rail proposed the closure of the line. It was instead sold to the Dart Valley Railway on 30 December 1972 and since then has been operated as a heritage railway. The railway is now promoted as the Dartmouth Steam Railway. In 2012 this new station was opened to attract visitors to the Greenway Estate, which was the home of crime writer Agatha Christie.

Description
A short platform is situated on the west side of the line at Hook Bottom, a short distance from the north end of Greenway Tunnel. A path leads to the road that links Galmpton and Greenway.

Services
Since the start of the COVID-19 lockdown in March 2020, no  services have called here, although they pass through.

References

Heritage railway stations in Devon
Railway stations in Great Britain opened in 2012
Railway stations built for UK heritage railways
Railway request stops in Great Britain